Poetry of Witness is a 2015 documentary film directed by Billy Tooma and Anthony Cirilo about the lives of six contemporary poets who have lived through, and survived, extremities such as war, torture, exile, and repression, using poetry to preserve their memories. It debuted October 16, 2015 at the Buffalo International Film Festival.

Synopsis 
The film documents the struggle of six contemporary poets who have faced the duress of war, exile, and human rights violations to give voice to their experiences while wrestling with the complex moral quandaries of artistic production, memory, and trauma. The poets: Carolyn Forché (Salvadoran Civil War), Saghi Ghahraman (Iranian Revolution), Fady Joudah (Doctors Without Borders), Claudia Serea (Socialist Republic of Romania), Mario Susko (Bosnian War), and Bruce Weigl (Vietnam War) offer first-person accounts of how their experiences as soldier, activist, doctor, and survivor imprint their poetry as evidence of those conflicts, rather than as representations of them.

Along the way, the poets read from their work and all poems are accompanied by original artwork by Jimmy Buitrago, as well as a musical score by Will Lewis. Duncan Wu (Georgetown University) and Neil J. Kressel (William Paterson University) help to contextualize these discussions throughout with historical and psychoanalytic perspectives.

The film can be seen as an extension of the decades-long work Forché has conducted in the subject, beginning with her anthology Against Forgetting: Twentieth Century Poetry of Witness (1993). Coinciding with the publication of a new anthology (co-edited by Forché and Wu), Poetry of Witness: The Tradition in English, 1500–2001 (2014), this documentary aims to bring this work to a wider audience.

References

External links 
 
 Anthony Cirilo speaks with The Huffington Post
 Carolyn Forché's Interview with Jane Wells
 Sandra Beasley on Poetry of Witness and Documentary Poetics

2015 films
2015 documentary films
American documentary films
2010s English-language films
2010s American films